The Borden Avenue Bridge is a retractable bridge in New York City, in the Long Island City neighborhood of Queens. It carries vehicular and pedestrian traffic across Dutch Kills, a tidal waterway that is a tributary of Newtown Creek. It was last retracted to allow marine traffic to pass in 2005. It was designed by Edward Abraham Byrne and opened on March 25, 1908.

The Borden Avenue bridge is one of four remaining retractable bridges in the United States, and one of two remaining in New York City, the other being the Carroll Street Bridge.

References

Bridges completed in 1908
Bridges in Queens, New York
Long Island City
Moveable bridges in the United States
Retractable bridges
Road bridges in New York City